Enerji Yapi-Yol Sen v Turkey [2009] ECHR 2251 is a European labour law case, relevant for UK labour law concerning the right to strike.

Facts
In April 1996, the Prime Minister’s Public Service Policy Directorate published a circular banning a one day public sector workers strike, organised by the trade union. It aimed to get a collective agreement. Members struck anyway, and were disciplined.

Judgment
The European Court of Human Rights held that there was a right to strike, albeit not unlimited.

Notes

References

United Kingdom labour case law